Pink Line 6 of the Mumbai Metro, or the Swami Samarth Nagar-Jogeshwari-Vikhroli-Kanjurmarg Line, is part of the metro system for the city of Mumbai, India. Major section of the line will run through the Jogeshwari–Vikhroli Link Road which is going to be fully elevated. It is being made through the MoU between DMRC and MMRDA.

Plans 
It is to be an elevated corridor.

It is to connect Swami Samarth Nagar-Lokhandwala in Andheri in the western suburbs to Vikhroli and Kanjurmarg in the eastern suburbs. The stations include Lokhandwala Complex, Adarsh Nagar, Momin Nagar, Jogeshwari-Vikhorli Link Road, Shyam Nagar, Mahakali Caves, SEEPZ Village, Saki Vihar Road, Ram Baug, Powai Lake, IIT Powai, Kanjurmarg (W) and Vikhroli - Eastern Express Highway. Pink Line is to provide interchange with Yellow Line at Adarsh Nagar, with Aqua Line at SEEPZ, with Green Line at Kanjurmarg (West), with Red Line at Jogeshwari Vikhroli Link Road and the Mumbai Suburban Railway at Jogeshwari on Western Railways and Kanjurmarg on Central Railway. Construction is to begin by December 2018.  It is to be ready by 2021–22.

Construction
The line was approved by Chief Minister Fadnavis on 19 October 2016. The MMRDA issued a tender to conduct a detailed aerial mapping survey of the alignment in April 2017.

Current status

Stations
The line will consist of 13 stations starting from Swami Samarth Nagar in Lokhandwala Complex, Andheri (West) to Vikhroli (East). It will have interchanges with Lines 2, 7, 3 and 4.

References

Mumbai Metro lines